Aghakhan Minakhan oghlu Abdullayev (6 February 1950 – 25 December 2016) was an Azerbaijani khananda folk singer. He was often called "Guardian" of the Mugham.

Life
Abdullayev was born in Baku where he graduated from secondary school in 1968, then continued his education at the Zeynally Music College until 1973. He became a mugham teacher in 1973 at the Abilov Culture House in Baku, and also worked as a teacher at the Zeynally Music College in 1977.

His concert career started in 1975 on the stage of Azerbaijan State Philharmonic Hall. He performed concerts in several countries of the world, including Iran, Canada, Russia, Austria, Sweden, US, and many other countries in Europe, Asia and Latin America.

In 1992, he was awarded the title of Honored Artist of the Azerbaijan Republic, and in 1998 he was designated People's Artist of the Azerbaijan Republic. In 2000, for his pedagogical activity, he was awarded an Honorary Diploma by the Ministry of Education of the Azerbaijan Republic. In 2001, he received the "Simurg" Award of the National Award Fund and in 2002 the Humay National Award. He also received in 2003 the "Live on, Azerbaijan" Award.

References

External links 
 

1950 births
2016 deaths
20th-century Azerbaijani male singers
Musicians from Baku
People's Artists of Azerbaijan
Mugham singers
Soviet male singers
Soviet Azerbaijani people